The Passo di Predèlp (is a high mountain pass of the Lepontine Alps (Saint-Gotthard Massif), located between the Valle Santa Maria and the Leventina, in Ticino.

The pass lies between Pizzo del Sole and Pizzo di Predèlp. It connects Carì (above Faido) with other passes in the Lukmanier region.

Below the Passo Predèlp, or more precisely just west of it, runs the Gotthard Base Tunnel.

References

External links
Passo Predèlp on Hikr

Mountain passes of the Alps
Mountain passes of Ticino